771 Libera, provisional designation 1913 TO, is a metallic asteroid from the middle region of the asteroid belt, about 29 kilometers in diameter. It was discovered by Austrian astronomer Joseph Rheden at the Vienna Observatory in Austria, on 21 November 1913.

Description 

The metallic X-type asteroid orbits the Sun at a distance of 2.0–3.3 AU once every 4 years and 4 months (1,576 days). Its orbit shows an eccentricity of 0.25 and is tilted by 15 degrees to the plane of the ecliptic. A photometric observation of the asteroid's light-curve performed at the Palmer Divide Observatory during 1999 rendered a rotation period of  hours with a brightness variation of 0.57 magnitude. The result concurs with several previous observations, including a photometric analysis conducted over a twelve-year interval.

According to the surveys carried out by the Infrared Astronomical Satellite, IRAS, the Japanese Akari satellite, and the U.S. Wide-field Infrared Survey Explorer with its subsequent NEOWISE mission, the asteroid's surface has an albedo of 0.13 and 0.14, respectively, while the Collaborative Asteroid Lightcurve Link publishes a slightly lower figure of 0.12 from an alternative result of the Supplemental IRAS Minor Planet Survey.

The minor planet was named by Mrs. Hedwig Rheden in honor of a friend of the discoverer.

References

External links 
 Lightcurve plot of 771 Libera, Palmer Divide Observatory, B. D. Warner (1999)
 Asteroid Lightcurve Database (LCDB), query form (info )
 Dictionary of Minor Planet Names, Google books
 Asteroids and comets rotation curves, CdR – Observatoire de Genève, Raoul Behrend
 Discovery Circumstances: Numbered Minor Planets (1)-(5000) – Minor Planet Center
 
 

000771
Discoveries by Joseph Rheden
Named minor planets
000771
000771
19131121